Kentucky Route 61 (KY 61) is a  long Kentucky State Highway extending north from the Tennessee state line in Cumberland County to Columbia in Adair County through to Greensburg in Green County.  From there, the route traverses LaRue, Hardin and Bullitt counties to terminate in Jefferson County (where it is commonly signed as Preston Street or Preston Highway) at the junction of U.S. Route 31E (East Main Street) in downtown Louisville.

Route description

Cumberland and Adair County
The first  of KY 61 is considered part of the Appalachian Development Highway System’s Corridor J project. That stretch of highway is one of five segments of that ADHS project, along with KY 90, US 27, KY 914, and KY 80 going from Burkesville through Burnside to London.

KY 61 runs concurrently with KY 90 into downtown Burkesville. KY 90 branches westward, while KY 61 goes onto a northwestward course, and turns northeast near the tripoint of the Cumberland, Metcalfe, and Adair County lines. Going north, the route crosses the Adair County line twice, and enters the far eastern tip of Metcalfe County before entering Adair County the second time.
KY 61 has junctions with the Louie B. Nunn Cumberland Parkway and KY 80 on the west side of Columbia. KY 55 (Columbia Bypass) also has a concurrency with KY 61 near Columbia as well.

Green, LaRue, Hardin, and Nelson Counties
KY 61 goes on a northwestward course to Green and LaRue counties, traversing Greensburg and Hodgenville, respectively. US 68 and KY 70 runs concurrently with KY 61 in Greensburg, then US 31E gets co-signed with KY 61 near Abraham Lincoln Birthplace National Historical Park. 
At Hodgenville, KY 61 continues northwest into Hardin County to the US 31W and Wendell H. Ford Western Kentucky Parkway junction in Elizabethtown, and runs concurrently with the northbound lanes of the U.S. route there. In downtown Elizabethtown, KY 61 begins a concurrency with US 62 from there through the I-65 Exit 94 interchange, all the way to just past Boston, in western Nelson County.

Bullitt County and Metro Louisville
KY 61 then runs further northward to Bullitt County (into Lebanon Junction and Shepherdsville) and then the Louisville-Jefferson County metro area, with major junctions with I-65, and then I-265 and I-264 (with access to I-264 eastbound only), along with US 150 (Broadway) before terminating in downtown Louisville at a junction with US 31E (East Main Street) at Louisville Slugger Field.

Major intersections

See also
Roads in Louisville, Kentucky

References

External links
 
 

 
 
 
 
KentuckyRoads.com KY 61

0061
0061
0061
0061
0061
0061
0061
0061
0061
0061
0061